Denis Semionov (Denis Igorevich Semenov; born 29 September 1985) - is a Russian new media artist.

Biography 
Denis Semionov was born in 1985 in Moscow. His great grandfather, a Russian-Finnish artist and sculptor Leonid Kuzmin, immigrated from USSR to Finland in 1920.
In 1953 the family repatriated to the USSR. In 2002 Semionov graduated from the courses of Stroganov Moscow State Academy of Arts and Industry, in 2007 – art and graphic faculty of Moscow State Pedagogical University, in 2010 - post graduate studies. At the university he worked as an illustrator and designer. After graduating - as a creative director of a new media studio "Great Gonzo Studio".

Projects 
Semionov generally uses virtual art and artificial intelligence art. In 2017 his VR art project “Between Petrov and Vodkin” about Russian avant-garde was demonstrated at Marché du Film and bought by several studios for distribution. In 2018 he won grand-prix at Open Frame Award of international film festival goEast for his VR cinematographic project “The Nominal Empire”, which was drawn in virtual reality in Oculus Quill. The interactive project combined virtual reality and biomechanics of Vsevolod Meyerhold. In 2019 Denis Semionov became one of five artists who created art pieces during WorldSkills 2019 opening on the 45 000 stadium Kazan arena in collaboration with a speaker Pranav Mistry and a singer Yolka. The project “Lessons of Auschwitz”, where Denis Semionov became an artist and a director, was made with Volumetric video, Tilt Brush and the music of the theremin, created by a musician Peter Theremin. The immersive story, devoted to 75th anniversary of Liberation of Auschwitz concentration camp, won such awards as Webby Award 2020, Red Dot and was shortlisted in Vancouver International Film Festival in the section Immersed Volumetric XR Market. The XR theatre performance "Flame", featured a dancer Samantha Alcon, was premiered at the festival NewImages by Forum des images in Paris  and was selected for the immersive section of Raindance Film Festival. The collaboration with Jean-Michel Jarre for the New Year 2021 concert "Welcome to the Other Side", which got 75 million viewers online and in VR, featured illustrative Notre-Dame de Paris, made in Oculus Quill. Semionov collaborated with such musicians and performers as Jean-Michel Jarre, Deborah Frances-White, institutions - Venice Biennale, Institut Français, Arts Council England, Deutsches Filminstitut, Forum des Images, Jewish Museum and Tolerance Center, brands – Leica, Samsung, Estée Lauder, Absolut

Awards 
2022 International Documentary Film Festival Amsterdam-ONX+DocLab MoCap Stage 
2021 Emmy Awards - Outstanding Interactive Media: Documentary - Nomination 
2021 The Drum Awards - Technical Innovation of the Year 
2021 Shorty Awards - Animations - Winner 
2021 Promax Awards -  Best use of Technology - Silver 
2021 Webby Award -  Virtual & Remote (Best Narrative Experience 2021) - Honoree
2021 Webby Award -  Virtual & Remote (Best Performance 2021, Music 2021) - Honoree
2021 Clio Awards - Bronze - Film Craft (music original)
2021 Los Angeles Film Awards (LAFA) - Gold - Best Virtual Reality
2020 Lovie Awards - Gold - Best Narrative Experience
2020 Webby Award - People`s Voice Winner (News (Immersive and Mixed reality), Volumetric/6 degrees of freedom)
2020 Red Dot - Best of the Best, Red Dot ("Lessons of Auschwitz")
2020 Shorty Awards - Winner in Facebook Video, Virtual Reality, Branded Content, Finalist in Storytelling, Long Form Video, Education, Audience Honor in Storytelling, Long Form Video, Virtual Reality, Branded Content
2020 Epica Awards - Silver - Media
2020 Creative Pool - Bronze - Post Production, Silver - Application, Bronze - Branded Content, Silver - Publishing, Bronze - Photography
2019 Creative Pool - Bronze - Post Production
2019 New York Festivals - Bronze - Video Art and Experimental film (Short Film)
2018 GoEast Open Frame Award - Grand Prix as the best VR Experience
2018 Epica Awards - Silver  - Digital

Festivals
 2023 South by Southwest
 2022 Cyber attack: Digital art and activism 
 2022 Portland Film Festival - Official selection at Animation short 
 2022 Raindance Immersive - Nomination as Best Immersive Experience, Best Immersive Experience for Social Impact, Discovery Award: Best Debut
 2021 Raindance Immersive - Nomination as Best Multiplayer Experience 
2021 Venice Film Festival - Venice Gap-Financing Market participant
2021 New Images Film Festival by Forum des images - Out of competition
2021 South by Southwest
2020 New Images Film Festival by Forum des images - Nomination in XR competition
2020 Raindance Immersive - Nomination as Best Multiplayer Experience
2020 New Images Film Festival by Forum des images - Performance of the opening
2020 Venice Film Festival - VR illustration for Venice VR Expanded
2020 Vancouver International Film Festival - Immersed Volumetric XR Market
2019 SXSW Edu - Participant
2019 NUFF 2019 - SEEK - Participant
2018 Cannes Film Festival (Marche du film) - Participant
2017 Moscow International Film Festival - Participant
2017 Berlin International Film Festival - Participant
2017 MIPTV Media Market - Participant
2017 Cannes Film Festival (Marche du film) - Participant

Public speaking and performances
 Open Innovations
 45th WorldSkills, Kazan, Russia
 TEDxYakimankaSalon «Art+Tech», (speakers: Denis Semionov, Olga Sviblova), Jewish Museum and Tolerance Center, Moscow, Russia
 Condé Nast Digital Day (NG), Moscow, Russia

References

External links
 
 
 

Living people
1985 births
Artists from Moscow
Stroganov Moscow State Academy of Arts and Industry alumni